Anna of Eppstein-Königstein (1481 in Königstein – 7 August 1538 in Stolberg) was the daughter of Philip I of Eppstein-Königstein and his wife, Louise de la Marck.

Marriage and issue
On 24 August 1500, Anna married Bodo VIII, Count of Stolberg-Wernigerode.  Bodo and Anna had many children:
 Wolfgang (born: 1 October 1500; died: 8 March 1552), married Dorothea of Regenstein-Blankenburg and Genovefa of Wied
 Bodo (born: 1502; died: after 2 May 1503)
 Anna (born: 28 January 1504; died 4 March 1574), the 28th Abbess of the Imperial Abbey at Quedlinburg
 Louis, (born: 12 January 1505; died: 1 September 1574), Count of Stolberg-Wernigeorde, married Walpurga Johanna of Wied-Runkel
 Juliana (born: 15 February 1506; died: 18 June 1580), married Philip II, Count of Hanau-Münzenberg and William I, Count of Nassau-Siegen; she is regarded as the matriarch of the House of Orange-Nassau
 Maria (born: 8 December 1507; died: 6 January 1571), married Kuno II, Count of Leiningen-Westerburg
 Henry (born: 2 January 1509; died: 12 November 1572), Count of Stolberg-Wernigerode, married Elisabeth of Gleichen-Rembda
 Philip (born: 24 May 1510; died: shortly after 21 September 1531)
 Magdalene (born: 6 November 1511; died 19 November 1546), married Ulrich IX, Count of Regenstein-Blankenburg
 Eberhard (born: 1513; died: 21 April 1526)
 Catherine (born: 24 October 1514; died: 18 June 1577), married Albert, Count of Henneberg
 Albert (born: 2 March 1516; died 4 July 1587), Count of Stolburg-Schwarza
 Christopher (born: 10 January 1524; died 8 August 1581), Count of Stolberg-Gedern

External links
Genealogy of Anna of Eppstein

1481 births
1538 deaths
15th-century German people
16th-century German women
16th-century German people
German countesses